Ray Hsu was a Canadian professor at the University of British Columbia. His primary research areas are virtual reality, augmented reality, and mixed reality.

Biography 
Hsu grew up in Toronto, Ontario. He received an Honours B.A. and an M.A. from the University of Toronto and a Ph.D. from the University of Wisconsin–Madison. He was a Postdoctoral Fellow at the University of British Columbia. He conducts research at the University of British Columbia's Emerging Media Lab and teaches at the Social Justice Institute.

In 2007, Hsu and his work were the subject of an episode of the television documentary series produced by Canadian filmmaker Maureen Judge.

In 2013, he was named one of Vancouver's "most promising entrepreneurs" by the Globe and Mail.

In 2017, he was a keynote speaker at Re-animating & Re-searching: Mobilizing Knowledge in Education.

Books 
 Anthropy (2004)
 Cold Sleep Permanent Afternoon (2010)

Awards 
 Gerald Lampert Award (2005)
 Lyman S.V. Judson and Ellen Mackechnie Judson Award (2007)

References

External links
 UBC Institute for Gender, Race, Sexuality and Social Justice - Profiles
 UBC Creative Writing Program (Faculty and Staff)
 Heart of a Poet documentary series
 Contemporary Verse 2 - Out of Line: Celebrating 40 Years

Living people
21st-century Canadian poets
Canadian people of Chinese descent
Writers from Toronto
Canadian writers of Asian descent
Canadian male poets
21st-century Canadian male writers
Year of birth missing (living people)